The 1983–84 season was the 73rd season in Hajduk Split’s history and their 38th in the Yugoslav First League. Their 2nd place finish in the 1982–83 season meant it was their 38th successive season playing in the Yugoslav First League.

Competitions

Overall

Yugoslav First League

Classification

Results summary

Results by round

Matches

Yugoslav First League

Sources: hajduk.hr

Yugoslav Cup

Sources: hajduk.hr

UEFA Cup

Source: hajduk.hr

Player seasonal records

Top scorers

Source: Competitive matches

See also
1983–84 Yugoslav First League
1983–84 Yugoslav Cup

References

External sources
 1983–84 Yugoslav First League at rsssf.com
 1983–84 Yugoslav Cup at rsssf.com
 1983–84 UEFA Cup at rsssf.com

HNK Hajduk Split seasons
Hajduk Split